The St. Thomas Observatory  is an astronomical observatory operated by the Department of Physics on the main campus of the University of St. Thomas in Minnesota. The observatory consists of an automated dome and a fully robotic 17-inch (0.43 m) corrected Dall-Kirkham reflecting telescope coupled with a 10.7-megapixel CCD camera.  The observatory is used for public observing events and facilitates student research projects.

See also 
List of astronomical observatories

References

External links
 

St. Paul Clear Sky Chart forecast of observing conditions covering the St. Thomas Observatory.

Astronomical observatories in Minnesota
University of St. Thomas (Minnesota)